is a stable of sumo wrestlers, part of the Dewanoumi ichimon or group of stables. It was set up in 1985 as Kitanoumi stable by former yokozuna Kitanoumi, who branched off from Mihogaseki stable. It absorbed Hatachiyama stable in 2006, following the death of its head coach, former ōzeki Hokuten'yū. In May 2010 it also absorbed Kise stable, which was forced to close after its stablemaster, former maegashira Higonoumi, was implicated in the selling of tournament tickets to yakuza members. As a result of this move the stable had 46 wrestlers, making it by some margin the largest stable in sumo at this time. It was the first stable to have over 40 wrestlers since Futagoyama stable in 1998, and had difficulty in finding room for so many. As a result, Kise was allowed to reestablish the stable in April 2012, and all former members of Kise stable, as well as newcomers Jōkōryū and Sasanoyama who had been recruited by Kise-oyakata, joined the reconstituted stable again.

Stablemaster Kitanoumi died of colorectal cancer and multiple organ failure on the evening of November 20, 2015. Former maegashira Ganyū, who had been serving as a coach at the stable, inherited it. The stable was renamed Yamahibiki, the elder name used by Ganyū, since the Kitanoumi name could not be inherited, due to it being a one-generation elder stock or ichidai-toshiyori. As of January 2022, Yamahibiki stable had 15 wrestlers. Following the demotion of Kitataiki after July 2017 tournament and Kitaharima after September 2017 tournament, it had no sekitori for the first time since May 2003.

Ring name conventions
A few wrestlers at this stable take ring names or shikona that begin with the character 北 (read: kita or hoku), meaning north, in deference to the stable's former owner, Kitanoumi. Some examples are Kitaharima, Kitataiki and Hokuseikai.

Owner

2015–present: Yamahibiki Kenji (riji, former maegashira Ganyū)
1985-2015: Kitanoumi (rijichō, the 55th yokozuna)

Coaches
Onogawa Akeyoshi (toshiyori, former maegashira Kitataiki)

Notable active wrestlers

Kitaharima (best rank maegashira)
 (best rank maegashira)

Notable former members
Hakurozan (former maegashira)
Kitazakura (former maegashira)
Kiyoseumi (former maegashira)
Kitataiki (former maegashira)
Ōrora (former makushita)

Referees
Kimura Kankurō  (jūryō gyōji, real name Yoshimi Nakamura)

Ushers
Tasuke (jūryō yobidashi, real name Taisuke Kominami)
Sōichi (makushita yobidashi, real name Sōichi Takahashi)
Hiromasa (jonokuchi yobidashi, real name Hiromasa Nakamura)

Hairdresser
Tokoasa (1st class tokoyama)

Location and access
Tokyo, Kōtō ward, Kiyosumi 2-10-11
3 minute walk from Kiyosumi-shirakawa Station on the Hanzōmon Line and Ōedo Line

See also
List of sumo stables
List of active sumo wrestlers
List of past sumo wrestlers
Glossary of sumo terms

References

External links
Japan Sumo Association profile of Yamahibiki beya
Article on Kitanoumi beya
Home Page

Active sumo stables